Tuggen is a municipality in March District in the canton of Schwyz in Switzerland.

History
According to Walafrid Strabo the Irish missionaries Columban and Gall arrived at Tuggen around the year 610. They intended to settle in the area, but fled after Gall had burnt down a local pagan holy place. Saint Gall is today depicted on the municipality's coat of arms.

Geography

Of this area, 62.7% is used for agricultural purposes, while 22.1% is forested. Of the rest of the land, 11.6% is settled (buildings or roads) and the remainder (3.6%) is non-productive (rivers, glaciers or mountains). The Buechberg hill is located on the area of the municipality. The former Tuggenersee was named after the municipality.

Demographics
, 14.7% of the population was made up of foreign nationals. Over the last 10 years the population has grown at a rate of 12.9%. Most of the population speaks German  (90.1%), with Italian being second most common ( 2.5%) and Serbo-Croatian being third ( 1.8%).

 the gender distribution of the population was 50.0% male and 50.0% female.  The age distribution, in Tuggen is; 735 people or 27.8% of the population is between 0 and 19.  861 people or 32.5% are 20 to 39, and 806 people or 30.5% are 40 to 64.  The senior population distribution is 137 people or 5.2% are 65 to 74.  There are 83 people or 3.1% who are 70 to 79 and 24 people or 0.91% of the population who are over 80.

 there are 1,013 households, of which 263 households (or about 26.0%) contain only a single individual.  90 or about 8.9% are large households, with at least five members.

In the 2007 election the most popular party was the SVP which received 53.9% of the vote.  The next three most popular parties were the FDP (21.1%), the CVP (12.4%) and the SPS (10.1%).

In Tuggen about 63.8% of the population (between age 25-64) have completed either non-mandatory upper secondary education or additional higher education (either university or a Fachhochschule).

Tuggen has an unemployment rate of 0.91%.  , there were 138 people employed in the primary economic sector and about 50 businesses involved in this sector.  372 people are employed in the secondary sector and there are 42 businesses in this sector.  345 people are employed in the tertiary sector, with 71 businesses in this sector.

Of the rest of the population,  there are 32 individuals (or about 1.21% of the population) who belong to the Orthodox Church, and there are less than 5 individuals who belong to another Christian church. There are 124 (or about 4.69% of the population) who are Islamic. There are 8 individuals (or about 0.30% of the population) who belong to another church (not listed on the census), 86 (or about 3.25% of the population) belong to no church, are agnostic or atheist, and 72 individuals (or about 2.72% of the population) did not answer the question.

The historical population is given in the following table:

Sports
FC Tuggen are the local football team. The team currently plays in Liga 1., the third highest tier in the Swiss football pyramid. They play at Linthstrasse.

Heritage sites of national significance

Grynau Castle and the historic bridge crossing over the Linth river are listed in the heritage site of national significance.

References

External links 

 
Municipalities of the canton of Schwyz